Hymedesmia is a genus of sponges belonging to the family Hymedesmiidae. The genus is divided into two subgenera, Hymedesmia (Hymedesmia) and Hymedesmia (Stylopus).

The genus has cosmopolitan distribution.

Species

Species:

Hymedesmia acerata 
Hymedesmia aequata 
Hymedesmia agariciicola 
Hymedesmia barnesi 
Hymedesmia pharos 

Species awaiting binomial:

Hymedesmia sp. 'Parpal Dumplin'

References

Poecilosclerida
Sponge genera